Luka Capan (born 6 April 1995) is a Croatian footballer who plays as defender for Hungarian club Budapest Honvéd.

Club career
His first involvement with Dinamo Zagreb was being an unused substitute in an UEFA Europa League defeat to Ludogorets. He was included in the squad following the injury of Jeremy Taravel.  He made his debut for the club in a 6–1 win against Slaven Belupo, coming as a 60th-minute substitute for Jozo Šimunović. In January 2018 Capan signed a -year contract with HNK Rijeka.

References

External links

 

1995 births
Living people
Footballers from Zagreb
Association football defenders
Croatian footballers
Croatia youth international footballers
Croatia under-21 international footballers
GNK Dinamo Zagreb players
NK Lokomotiva Zagreb players
HNK Rijeka players
Bursaspor footballers
Budapest Honvéd FC players
Croatian Football League players
TFF First League players
Nemzeti Bajnokság I players
Croatian expatriate footballers
Expatriate footballers in Turkey
Croatian expatriate sportspeople in Turkey
Expatriate footballers in Hungary
Croatian expatriate sportspeople in Hungary